The G-506 trucks, -ton, 4x4, produced as the Chevrolet G7100 (and originally G4100) models, were a series of (light) medium four wheel drive trucks used by the United States Army and its allies during and after World War II. This series came in standard cargo, as well as many specialist type bodies.

History
The G506 was a United States Army Ordnance Corps supply catalog designation for the -ton, 4X4, truck chassis built in large numbers by the Chevrolet Motor Division of GM. Their official model numbers were initially the "G4100", and later the "G7100" series. They became standard -ton 4x4 trucks for the US Army and Army Air Corps during World War II.

During World War II, the US military purchased a total of 167,373 four by four 1-ton trucks, and Chevrolet supplied the great majority of them. According to the 1946 revision of the U.S. military's Summary Report of Acceptances, Tank-Automotive Materiel, Dodge (Fargo) – the initial standard supplier of U.S. -ton 4x4 trucks – contributed 6,762 VF model, G-621 series trucks in 1940; and Ford (Marmon-Herrington) and Diamond T supplied another 6,271 and 136 units respectively, leaving 154,204 Chevrolet trucks.

However, some 47,700 of the G7107 and G7117 model trucks were shipped to the Soviet Union as part of the Lend-Lease program. The Soviet Red Army's logistics/transport capabilities improved dramatically in the spring and summer of 1943 largely as a result of the steady supply of American-made trucks (such as Studebaker US6s and the Chevrolet G506s) for the USSR.

Specifications

Engine and driveline

The G506 used a Chevrolet BV-1001-UP, a 
This is a smaller version of the engine used in the GMC CCKW.

All models had a four-speed manual non-synchronized transmission and a two-speed transfer case.

Chassis
The G506 had a ladder frame with two live beam axles on semi-elliptic leaf springs. GM banjo type axles were used, these axles were also used in later GMC CCKW  ton (2,268kg) trucks. All models had hydraulic brakes with vacuum boost, 7.50-20" tires and dual rear tires.

Body
Almost all G-506s had closed Chevrolet cabs, shared with the closed cab versions of the GMC CCKW – except for three models. A panel van version was built for the Army Signal Corps, open cabs were used on bomb servicers and cab over engine types were used for long-bodied cargo trucks. The pilot models had flat top panels of the front fender, but production trucks had arches over at the fender crowns.

Versions

Model G4103 book symbol YK - stake and platform COE, K-33 truck
Model G4112 book symbol YQ - truck cargo, LWB, 4X4,
Model G4163 book symbol ZP - truck cargo, W/Winch, 4X4,
Model G4174 book symbol ZQ - truck cargo, LWB, 4X4,
Model G7103 book symbol NE - cab
Model G7105 book symbol NG - panel body, see also K-51, and K-70 van
Model G7106 book symbol NH - dump body, less winch (9,008 built without a winch)
Model G7107 book symbol NJ - cargo body, less winch (86,871 built)
Model G7113 book symbol NK - cab (tractor)
Model G7116 book symbol NL - dump body, with winch (5,133 built with a winch)
Model G7117 book symbol NM - cargo body, with winch (26,207 built)
Model G7127 book symbol NP - truck cargo, LWB (long wheelbase, 383 built)
Model G7128 book symbol NQ - M6 bomb service truck G35 (extra-short wheelbase, 7,868 built)
Model G7132 book symbol NN - stake and platform COE, K-54 Truck
Model G7163 book symbol NR - telephone body, with earth borer, see also K-44 truck

Model G7173 book symbol NS - telephone maintenance body, see also K-43 truck

 Army Air Force versions

E5 turret trainer
J3 field lighting truck
J4 field lighting truck
J5 field lighting truck
fire truck, class 135, fog and foam

See also
List of U.S. military vehicles by supply catalog designation (G506)
List of U.S. Signal Corps vehicles

Notes

References

External links

Chevrolet G506 at Olive-Drab.com
 US -ton at Engines of the Red Army

Military trucks of the United States
G506
Soft-skinned vehicles
World War II vehicles of the United States
Motor vehicles manufactured in the United States
Military communications of the United States
Military vehicles introduced from 1940 to 1944